Oge Mora is a children's book illustrator and author living in Providence, Rhode Island. She received a Caldecott Honor, Coretta Scott King John Steptoe Award for New Talent, and Ezra Jack Keats Book Award in 2019 for her book, Thank You, Omu!. 

Her parents emigrated from Nigeria to Columbus, Ohio. Mora attended the Rhode Island School of Design (RISD). While taking a class called "Picture and Word" at RISD, she created a picture book mock-up, titled Omu's Stew for her final project. The teacher invited editors and art directors to see the final work and Mora's draft was picked up by publisher Little, Brown and Company and published as Thank You, Omu!.

Her illustrations are created with cut paper, paint, and china markers.

Works

Author and illustrator 
 Thank You, Omu!, 2018
 Saturday, 2019

Illustrator 
 Shaking Things Up: 14 Young Women Who Changed the World, 2018, contributing illustrator
 The Oldest Student: How Mary Walker Learned to Read, 2020
 Everybody in the Red Brick Building, October 2021

References 

American children's book illustrators
American writers
American people of African descent
Rhode Island School of Design alumni
Year of birth missing (living people)
Living people
People from Columbus, Ohio